Sporosarcina is a genus of bacteria.

Specification 
The cells of the species of Sporosarcina are either rod-shaped or coccoid. Sporosarcina forms endospores. The majority species of Sporosarcina is moveable (motile).

Metabolism 
All species of Sporosarcina are heterotrophic. They do not perform photosynthesis. A few species are obligate aerobic, they need oxygen. Others are facultative aerobic, they can also perform metabolism in the absence of oxygen.

Ecology 
Some species, such as S. ureae have the enzyme urease and are thus able to break down  urea. The species forms the highest population densities in soils that are subject to influence of urine. These include, for example, meadows where cattle are kept. Thus S. ureae plays an important role in the ecosystem.

Molecular Signatures 
Analyses of genome sequences of Sporosarcina species identified eight conserved signature indels (CSIs) that are uniquely present in this genus in the proteins aspartate–tRNA ligase, A/G-specific adenine glycosylase, thymidylate synthase, RDD family protein, DEAD/DEAH box helicase, membrane protein insertase YidC, cytochrome b6, and a hypothetical protein. These molecular signatures provide a novel and reliable method to molecularly distinguishing Sporosarcina species from other genera in the family Caryophanaceae and other bacteria.

Systematics 
Sporosarcina belongs to the Bacillota. Some examples of species:
Sporosarcina luteola Tominaga et al. 2009
 Sporosarcina aquimarina Yoon et al. 2001
 Sporosarcina contaminans Kämpfer et al. 2010
 Sporosarcina globispora (Larkin and Stokes 1967) Yoon et al. 2001
 Sporosarcina newyorkensis Wolfgang et al. 2012
 Sporosarcina pasteurii (Miquel 1889) Yoon et al. 2001
 Sporosarcina psychrophila  (Nakamura 1984) Yoon et al. 2001
 Sporosarcina saromensis An et al. 2007
 Sporosarcina siberiensis Zhang et al. 2014
 Sporosarcina soli Kwon et al. 2007
 Sporosarcina terrae Sun et al. 2017
 Sporosarcina thermotolerans Kämpfer et al. 2010
 Sporosarcina ureae (Beijerinck 1901) Kluyver and van Niel 1936

References 

Bacillales
Gram-positive bacteria
Bacteria genera